José Joaquín Rojas Gil (born 8 June 1985) is a Spanish professional road racing cyclist, who currently rides for UCI WorldTeam .

Career
His older brother Mariano Rojas, was a professional cyclist as well, riding for  until 1996. He died in the same year as a result of a traffic accident.

Rojas was selected to ride the 2012 Tour de France, but crashed out on Stage 3, with a fractured left collarbone, the second retirement of the 2012 Tour after 's Kanstantsin Sivtsov.

Rojas was again selected to ride the 2013 Tour de France and finished 79th overall, one of the highest GC placings among the sprinters; he also finished in 7th place in the points classification with 156 points. His best result was a third place on the third stage – in which he contested the bunch sprint – which was one of seven top-ten finishes during the Tour. He was disqualified from the 2014 Tour de France for excessive sheltering behind his team car during the descent of the Tourmalet.

Major results

2002
 1st  Road race, National Junior Road Championships
2003
 1st  Time trial, National Junior Road Championships
 4th Road race, UCI Junior Road World Championships
2005
 2nd Overall Vuelta a Extremadura
1st Points classification
2006
 1st  Mountains classification Tirreno–Adriatico
 7th Overall Three Days of De Panne
 10th Circuito de Getxo
2007
 1st Stage 1 Vuelta a Murcia
 2nd Trofeo Mallorca
 2nd Trofeo Cala Millor
 3rd Circuito de Getxo
 6th Prueba Villafranca de Ordizia
 9th Overall Tour de Pologne
1st  Points classification
 9th Gent–Wevelgem
 10th Châteauroux Classic
2008
 1st Trofeo Pollença
 2nd Gran Premio de Llodio
 3rd Overall Tour Down Under
1st  Young rider classification
 4th Overall Four Days of Dunkirk
 4th Overall Tour du Limousin
 5th Overall Paris–Corrèze
 5th Trofeo Cala Millor
 5th Clásica de Almería
 5th GP Ouest–France
 5th Vattenfall Cyclassics
 6th Trofeo Mallorca
 7th Gent–Wevelgem
2009
 1st Stage 2 Tour de l'Ain
 3rd Overall Tour Down Under
1st  Young rider classification
 4th Trofeo Pollença
 4th Gran Premio de Llodio
 5th Down Under Classic
 9th Trofeo Cala Millor
2010
 2nd Gran Premio dell'Insubria-Lugano
 3rd Overall Four Days of Dunkirk
1st  Points classification
 4th Trofeo Magaluf-Palmanova
 5th Trofeo Deià
 5th GP Ouest–France
 6th Paris–Camembert
 7th Trofeo Cala Millor
 8th Overall Tour du Limousin
 9th Trofeo Palma
2011
 1st  Road race, National Road Championships
 1st Trofeo Deià
 1st Stage 6 Volta a Catalunya
 2nd Clásica de Almería
 3rd Trofeo Magaluf-Palmanova
 4th Overall Tour du Haut Var
 4th Trofeo Palma
 5th Vattenfall Cyclassics
 7th Overall Tour du Poitou-Charentes
 7th GP Ouest–France
 8th Down Under Classic
 10th Trofeo Cala Millor
 2012
 1st Stage 1 Tour of the Basque Country
 1st Stage 1 (TTT) Vuelta a España
 9th Trofeo Migjorn
2013
 3rd Trofeo Campos–Santanyí–Ses Salines
 4th Vattenfall Cyclassics
 5th Trofeo Platja de Muro
 6th Overall Vuelta a Castilla y León
 6th Trofeo Palma de Mallorca
 8th Down Under Classic
2014
 Vuelta a Castilla y León
1st  Points classification 
1st Stage 1
 4th Overall Paris–Nice
 4th Circuito de Getxo
 5th Vuelta a Murcia
 6th Clásica de Almería
2015
 1st Stage 1 Tour of Qatar
 3rd Trofeo Santanyi-SesSalines-Campos
 4th Circuito de Getxo
 4th Trofeo Serra de Tramuntana
 5th Gran Piemonte
2016
 1st  Road race, National Road Championships
 10th Clásica de Almería
2017
 3rd Vuelta a La Rioja
 5th Amstel Gold Race
 10th GP Industria & Artigianato di Larciano
  Combativity award Stage 18 Vuelta a España
2018
 6th Trofeo Matteotti
 8th Trofeo Palma
 9th Vuelta a Murcia
2019
 5th Circuito de Getxo
 5th Clásica de Almería
 9th Trofeo Serra de Tramuntana
 10th Trofeo Palma
2021
 4th Vuelta a Murcia
2023
 4th Clàssica Comunitat Valenciana 1969

Grand Tour general classification results timeline

References

External links

 

Spanish male cyclists
Living people
1985 births
People from Cieza, Murcia
Cyclists at the 2012 Summer Olympics
Olympic cyclists of Spain
Cyclists from the Region of Murcia